According to a timetable published in 1969 Air Vietnam served these cities:

Asia

East Asia 
 
Taipei – Songshan Airport

Osaka – Itami Airport
Tokyo – Haneda Airport

Hong Kong – Kai Tak Airport

Southeast Asia 
 Laos
Vientiane – Wattay Airport

Kuala Lumpur – Subang Skypark
 Philippines
Manila – Manila International Airport

Singapore – Singapore International Airport
  South Vietnam
Cà Mau - Cà Mau Airport
Da Nang - Da Nang Airfield
Đắk Lắk Province - Buon Ma Thuot Airport
Kontum - Kontum Airfield
Nha Trang - Nha Trang Airport
Phan Thiết - Phan Thiet Air Base
Phú Quốc - Duong Dong Airport
Saigon – Tan Son Nhut International Airport (Hub)
Tam Kỳ - Chu Lai International Airport

Bangkok – Bangkok International Airport

Europe 
 
Paris – Orly Airport

Future Destinations

East Asia 
 South Korea
Seoul – Kimpo International Airport

Southeast Asia 

Denpasar – Ngurah Rai International Airport

Terminated Destinations
List of terminated destinations of Air Vietnam:

Asia

South Asia

Calcutta – Dum Dum Airport

Karachi – Jinnah International Airport

Southeast Asia
 Cambodia
Phnom Penh – Pochentong International Airport
Siem Reap - Siem Reap International Airport
 Laos
Seno – Seno Air Base
 
Nha Trang - Nha Trang Airport

Middle East
 Iran
Teheran – Mehrabad International Airport

Europe
 
Rome – Ciampino–G. B. Pastine International Airport

Oceania

Sydney - Sydney Airport

References

Lists of airline destinations